Aliabad Cheragh (also Romanized as ‘Alīābād Cherāgh; also known as ‘Alīābād) is a village in Khaveh-ye Jonubi Rural District, in the Central District of Delfan County, Lorestan Province, Iran. At the 2006 census, its population was 139, in 32 families.

References 

Towns and villages in Delfan County